The Bullseyes-Tokyo are an American football team located in Minato, Tokyo, Japan.  They are a member of the X-League.

Team history
1993 Team Founded. First played in the independent I-League
1994 Joined the X-League X3 division. 
1997 Won Metropolitan Division title. (6 wins, 0 losses)
1998 Junior X Conference transition tournament. (1 win, 3 losses)
2001 X3 Central championship. (4 wins, 1 loss) Won X3-X2 replacement game.
2005 X2 East Championship. (5 wins, 0 losses) Lost X2-X1 replacement game.
2008 X2 Central championship. (5 wins, 0 losses) Promoted from X2 to X1 after the withdrawal of Rockbull from X1.
2009 X1 Central 6th place. (0 wins, 7 losses)
2012 X1 East 6th place. (1 win, 6 losses). Loses replacement game to Tokyo MPD Eagles. Demoted to X2.
2015 Promoted from X2 to X1 for the following season.

Seasons

References

External links
  (Japanese)

American football in Japan
1993 establishments in Japan
American football teams established in 1993
X-League teams